Yamla Pagla Deewana 2 is a 2013 Indian Hindi-language action comedy film directed by Sangeeth Sivan. It is a sequel to the 2011 film, Yamla Pagla Deewana and the second installment of Yamla Pagla Deewana film series. It features Dharmendra, Sunny Deol and Bobby Deol from the previous film, with Kristina Akheeva and Neha Sharma as the female leads.

The film's theatrical trailer was released on 27 March 2013 on YouTube, and its music rights were acquired by Yash Raj Films. Yamla Pagla Deewana 2 was released on 7 June 2013.

Plot
In Varanasi, Dharam Dhillon (Dharmendra) and his son Gajodhar—or Prem (Bobby Deol)—are conning people into thinking that Dharam is a guru named Yamla Baba. When Yograj Khanna (Annu Kapoor) comes from England to meet Dharam, Dharam notices Khanna's diamond rings. Dharam and Gajodhar pretend to own a company, Oberoi, Oberoi & Oberoi. Impressed, Yograj begins to consider a match for his daughter Suman (Neha Sharma). Suman falls in love with Gajodhar, and a marriage is arranged in England when Dharam's older son Param (Sunny Deol)—a loan-recovery agent for a bank—meets Khanna.

Param appears at Khanna's club as Joginder (Dude) Armstrong (Anupam Kher) arrives to take it over, and beats up Armstrong's flunkies and goons. Grateful, Khanna hires him as his manager. Paramveer then finds Dharam and Gajodhar trying to swindle his boss.

Dharam and Gajodhar go to a house occupied by an orangutan, Einstein, whose absent owner (a disciple of Yamla Baba) has allowed them to stay there. The next day they go to Khanna's house for Gajodhar and Suman's engagement party, at which Paramveer is a guest. Paramveer meets art-gallery employee Reet (Kristina Akheeva), with whom he falls in love. After Suman and Gajodhar are engaged, Gajodhar and Dharam discover that Reet (not Suman) is Khanna's daughter.

Although Gajodhar woos Reet, she is interested in Paramveer. Dharam claims to have another child, Prem's twin Q (Bobby Deol). When Q meets the Khannas he claims to be a painter, which attracts Reet.

Q unsuccessfully tries to produce a painting. During the night Einstein paints a beautiful picture, which Q passes off as his own. The painting becomes famous, and will be sold at auction. Paramveer makes changes to Khanna's nightclub, and Khanna wants Q to be his guest of honor. At the party, Reet asks Paramveer how he feels about her. Drunk, he tries to reveal Q's identity when he is distracted by Armstrong's goons. The next morning Reet goes to Paramveer's house but leaves, heartbroken, when she sees a girl sleeping with him.

Preparations for Prem and Suman's marriage are underway. Reet agrees to marry Q, and Paramveer wants a joint wedding. Dharam tries to convince Suman that Prem is impotent, and anyone who marries him will die in seven months. Despite this, Suman tells Prem that she loves him and Prem falls in love with her. When he goes to tell the truth to the Khannas, Armstrong's goons kidnap him, Dharam and the Khannas. Prem reveals the truth, Param saves everyone from the goons and proposes to Reet (which she accepts), and the film ends happily.

Cast
 Dharmendra as Dharam Singh Dhillon / Dharam Oberoi / Yamla Baba
 Sunny Deol as Paramveer Singh Dhillon
 Bobby Deol as Gajodhar Singh Dhillon / Prem Oberoi / Q Oberoi
 Kristina Akheeva as Reet Khanna
 Neha Sharma as Suman Khanna
 Anupam Kher as Joginder (Dude G.) Armstrong
 Annu Kapoor as Yograj Khanna
 Johnny Lever as Bunty
 Sucheta Khanna as Babli
 Arjun as an Inspector in London

Soundtrack

The film's songs were composed by brothers Shaarib-Toshi, while the promo track "Main Taan Aida Hi Nachna' was composed by Sachin Gupta, with lyrics by Kumaar.

The film score was composed by Raju Singh.

Track listing

Production
A sequel to Yamla Pagla Deewana was announced after the success of the original, and it began filming in September 2012. The UK casting coordinator was Sany Supra, founder and CEO of Crown Global Agency.

Yamla Pagla Deewana 2 was produced by Dharmendra and his production company, YPD Films UK, and distributed by Sunny Sounds. Online promotion was by Yash Raj Films, with its trailer and song promos uploaded to the YRF YouTube channel.

This film is officially titled Yamla Pagla Deewana Jawaana.

Filming
UK locations were in Leicester, Birmingham and London, with filming beginning on 17 September 2012 in Leicester.

Casting
Although Asin was offered the female lead, the actress had scheduling conflicts. The director and production team cast Neha Sharma after seeing her in Kyaa Super Kool Hain Hum. And Salman Khan was offered to join with Sunny Deol, Dharmendra And Bobby Deol, The actor had scheduling conflicts. Salman Khan is busy for his film Jai Ho.

Development
After the success of Yamla Pagla Deewana, Dharmendra announced a sequel. When the original director Samir Karnik opted out of the sequel, Sangeeth Sivan agreed to write and direct. Sunny Deol's son, Rocky, was assistant director. In January 2013 shooting began in Mandav, Maheshwar and Indore, Madhya Pradesh.

Critical reception
Yamla Pagla Deewana 2 received negative reviews, with Sukanya Verma of rediff.com calling it an unimaginative, tedious film. Karan Anshuman rated the film 1.5 out of 5, and Saibal Chaterjee of NDTV gave it a rating of 2.0 out of 5. A FirstPost.com reviewer said, "Yamla Pagla Deewana 2 will give you a migraine". IBN Live gave the film two out of five stars: "Rarely do we see contemporary actors giving tribute to each other. The stature of Salman Khan is celebrated in #YPD2. It's a pity the jokes run out faster than your popcorn does."

Bollywood Life gave it three out of five stars: "Dharmendra charms, Sunny Deol roars, Bobby Deol entertains! As predicted by the movie's makers, trade pundits and us, the dumdaar Deol family has certainly doubled up the magic this time. We are impressed!" The Times of India gave the film 2.5 out of 5 stars and said, "On the upside, a very attractive Sunny stays this movie's brave heart." Koimoi gave it two out of five stars: "Yamla Pagla Deewana 2 is loaded with excerpts from Dabangg Khan's demeanor and mannerisms. Plus, there is an interesting Orangutan’s revelry which does tickle you right!" Filmfare gave it four out of five stars: "YPD2 gets two things right. The first is Sunny Deol's performance. He's a Super Sardar in the movie. He's continuing where he left off in Border, Gadar and YPD. He can beat up an army all alone. Only this time he has a supersonic roar, he massacres a whole legion of Ninjas, battles gigantic Sumo wrestlers and lifts a goddamn truck with one hand. The self-deprecating humour and parody with Sunny is hilarious. The other good thing is the use of a painting as a humour motif. Everyone seems to break into tears of disbelief and awe on seeing this painting. Funny thing is, it's painted by the man in the monkey suit, while he's piss drunk and has used his bum as a paint brush."

Box office
Yamla Pagla Deewana 2 had an average gross abroad during its first weekend. In the UK the film earned ₹15 million, and ₹12.8 million in North America. In the UAE and on the GCC circuit, it grossed ₹9,809,000. In Australia, the film earned ₹32.8 million over its first weekend. In New Zealand it earned ₹R6 million, and ₹919,000 in Fiji.

See also
Yamla Pagla Deewana (film series)
Yamla Pagla Deewana: Phir Se

References

External links
 
 

2013 films
2013 action comedy films
Indian action comedy films
Vijayta Films films
Indian sequel films
Films shot in London
Films set in London
2010s Hindi-language films
Films directed by Sangeeth Sivan
2013 comedy films